Mimohyllisia tonkinensis is a species of beetle in the family Cerambycidae, and the only species in the genus Mimohyllisia. It was described by Stephan von Breuning in 1948.

References

Agapanthiini
Beetles described in 1948
Monotypic beetle genera